Pınar Soykan (born 24 April 1980) is a Turkish singer.

She was educated in Kocaeli until 1999. Following the 1999 İzmit earthquake, she quite her first job as a teacher. In 2004, she moved to Istanbul and took part in the Best Model of Turkey beauty competition, where she ranked 16. After receiving, music lessons from Fatih Ertür, she released her first EP Kına. In 2014, her first studio album, Buğulu Gözler, was released by Doğan Music Company and featured elements of both pop and fantezi music. Yıldız Tilbe and Orhan Ölmez were among the songwriters whose work appeared in the album. Pınar Soykan is married to Orçun Soykan.

Discography 
Albums
 Buğulu Gözler (2014)

EPs
 Kına (2011)

Singles
 "Yokum Ben" (2017)
 "Mesela" (2018)
 "Yıkılmam" (2018)
 "Üzülme" (2019)
 "İkimiz Adına" (2020)
 "Bilemedim" (2022)

References

External links
 Pınar Soykan Official
 Pınar SOYKAN
 iTunes

Living people
Turkish beauty pageant winners
Singers from Istanbul
1980 births